John Barry  (1728–1794) was an Irish Anglican Dean.

Barry was born in Cork and educated at Trinity College, Dublin. He was Dean of Elphin from 1778 until his death in 1794.

References 

Irish Anglicans
Clergy from Cork (city)
1728 births
1794 deaths
18th-century Irish Anglican priests